Bino may refer to:

 Binoculars
 Bino (footballer) (born 1972), Portuguese footballer
 Bino (particle)
 Bino (singer) (1953–2010), Italian pop singer
 Bino, Uzbekistan, an Uzbek village